"You Don't Love Me" is a rhythm and blues-influenced blues song recorded by American musician Willie Cobbs in 1960.  Adapted from Bo Diddley's 1955 song "She's Fine She's Mine", it is Cobbs' best-known song and features a guitar figure and melody that has appealed to musicians in several genres.

Although it became a regional hit when it was released in Memphis, Tennessee, copyright issues prevented its further promotion and national chart success.  The song inspired many adaptations, such as "Shimmy Shimmy Walk" by the Megatons and "You Don't Love Me (No, No, No)" by Jamaican singer Dawn Penn. The Allman Brothers Band popularized it with their extended jam concert performances, as captured on At Fillmore East (1971).

Background
Willie Cobbs, an Arkansas native, moved to Chicago in 1947, where he began exploring the burgeoning blues scene centered around Maxwell Street.  While in Chicago, he learned the blues harp from Little Walter and began an association with pianist Eddie Boyd.  In 1958, Cobbs recorded an unsuccessful single for Ruler Records and auditioned for James Bracken and Vee-Jay Records, who felt that he sounded too similar to their biggest artist, Jimmy Reed.

Cobbs and Boyd eventually returned to Arkansas and began performing in the local clubs.  Cobbs claims that he heard a field hand singing "Uh, uh, uh, you don't love me, yes I know" to a haunting melody one morning and that inspired him to write a song.  Music journalist Rob Chapman calls "You Don't Love Me" "Willie Cobbs's 1961 adaptation and retitling of Bo Diddley's 1955 'She's Fine, She's Mine'."  Bo Diddley recorded the song in 1955 for Checker Records, a Chess subsidiary.

Cobbs began performing "You Don't Love Me" to enthusiastic audiences and approached a record label in Memphis, Tennessee, with the hope of recording it. The owner of the Home of the Blues record company turned him down—"He said, 'It's a damn good song but you can't sing'", Cobbs recalled.  However, two other producers, Billy Lee Riley and Stan Kessler, overheard the audition and offered to record him.

Recording and composition
Cobbs and Boyd entered the Echo Studio in Memphis to record "You Don't Love Me" for Riley's Mojo Records. Cobbs sang while Boyd accompanied him on piano. According to Cobb and Boyd, Sammy Lawhorn, who later was a member of Muddy Waters' touring band, provided the distinctive guitar figure.  A Vee-Jay discography lists Rico Collins on tenor saxophone, Wilbert Harris on drums, and Cobbs on bass. However, Cobbs claims that an unknown bassist performed for the session, after his regular bass player had quit.  Instead of the common twelve-bar blues arrangement, the verses are sung on the IV chord, while the instrumentation repeats the riff on the I chords:

Cobbs' song uses Bo Diddley's guitar riff and melody, as well as many of the lyrics, including the key "you don't love me, you don't love me I know" line.  A review in Billboard magazine noted, "While this is a traditional blues in form, the unusual, almost exotic, arrangement with its hypnotic beat combined with Bo Diddley's anguished vocal takes this far out of the range of the ordinary".  Diddley uses a repeated figure on his tremolo-laden guitar and the first verses are sung without lyrics:

The lyrics "she's fine she's mine" do not appear in the song (Diddley had recorded an unrelated song, "You Don't Love Me (You Don't Care)", with different music and lyrics two months prior on March 2, 1955, which was released on his Go Bo Diddley album).  "She's Fine She's Mine" was included as the B-side to his second single, "Diddley Daddy".  Although "Diddley Daddy" became a hit, "She's Fine She's Mine" did not appear in the record charts.

Releases and copyright issue
Almost immediately after Mojo Records issued the single, it became a number one hit in Memphis. Hoping to reach a wider audience, Kessler and Riley sold the master recording to Home of the Blues Records, the label that had previously turned Cobbs down.  They subsequently issued the single and in an April 3, 1961, review of new records in Billboard, it was listed under "R&B Limited Potentials". Home of the Blues also leased the single to Vee-Jay Records (who had also passed on recording Cobbs), who issued it; a review by Billboard on November 27, 1961, indicated that it had "strong sales potential". (An additional release by Ruler Records has overdubbed organ.)

Trouble ensued when Riley took the songwriting credit for "Shimmy Shimmy Walk, Part 1", an instrumental version of the song recorded by the Megatons, a Louisiana-based group.  According to blues historian Gerard Herzhaft, Riley asserts that he was the only guitarist at Cobbs' Mojo session, contrary to Cobbs' and Lawhorn's recollections. Lawsuits were filed, Vee-Jay stopped promoting the single, and it failed to reach the Billboard charts.  Cobbs has revisited "You Don't Love Me" several times, including in 1998 for his Pay or Do 11 Months & 29 Days album.

Adaptations by other artists

The Megatons
In 1961, the Megatons, a Louisiana-based instrumental combo, recorded "Shimmy, Shimmy Walk, Part 1" an instrumental version of "You Don't Love Me".  It was released as a two-part single by Dodge Records, based in Feriday, Louisiana. A singles review in Billboard described it as "A rousing medium tempo rocker with a teen dance sound and a rousing r.&b. flavor receives a strong performance from the instrumental group. Side I is the hot side, it swings." The single was later distributed by Checker Records and reached number 88 on the Billboard Hot 100.  Albert King recorded "Shimmy, Shimmy Walk" for the 1969 Years Gone By album, although some releases list it as "You Don't Love Me (instrumental)".

Junior Wells
"You Don't Love Me" was a staple of Junior Wells and Buddy Guy's repertoire. In 1965, the duo recorded the song as "You Don't Love Me Baby" for their influential album Hoodoo Man Blues.  Their version altered the guitar figure somewhat and added some new lyrics:

Junior Wells later recorded the song for his album Coming at You (1968); Buddy Guy also recorded it for Hold That Plane! (1972).

In 1968, Al Kooper with Stephen Stills recorded "You Don't Love Me" for the highly successful Super Session album. Later, Kooper explained in his autobiography: "[The Wells/Guy version] was usually done as a shuffle, but I found it lent itself well to a heavy-metal eighth-note feel. Later, when I mixed the album, I put the two-track mix through a process called 'phasing' that gave it an eerie jet-plane effect." AllMusic critic Lindsay Planer noted in an album review: "Updating the blues standard 'You Don't Love Me' allows Stills to sport some heavily distorted licks, which come off sounding like Jimi Hendrix."

Dawn Penn
Jamaican singer Dawn Penn recorded "You Don't Love Me" in 1967.  She was introduced to the song by producer Coxsone Dodd, who imported American rhythm and blues records to play for his sound system entertainment businesses. Most of the Bo Diddley/Willie Cobbs melody and lyrics were used, however, her version featured a rocksteady backing arrangement instead of the guitar riff. 

In 1994, she remade it as the dancehall-influenced "You Don't Love Me (No, No, No)", which was an international hit.  Penn's rendition inspired versions by Rihanna, who recorded it in 2005 with Vybz Kartel for Music of the Sun, and Beyoncé Knowles for the I Am... World Tour live CD/DVD in 2010 .

Allman Brothers Band
The Allman Brothers Band included the song on their original lineup setlist.  According to Buddy Guy biographer Alan Harper, "Junior's [Wells's 1965 Hoodoo Man album] version of 'You Don't Love Me' had inspired the Allman Brothers to cover the song on their live At Fillmore East [1971] album." Duane Allman chose "You Don't Love Me"  to create a special tribute to recently slain R&B saxophonist King Curtis, interweaving Curtis' signature "Soul Serenade" into a rendition of the song played at a band show at the Academy of Music in Manhattan on August 15, 1971.  A version of the "You Don't Love Me/Soul Serenade" medley was subsequently recorded as part of a in-studio concert held at record label A&R Studios in Manhattan on August 26, 1971, and broadcast live by WPLJ-FM.  It was first released on the band's Dreams compilation in 1989, and later on Live from A&R Studios in 2016.

Recognition and legacy
Blues historian Gerard Herzhaft notes that "the riff of 'You Don't Love Me' has inspired quantities of bluesmen".  The song has been interpreted and recorded by artists in a variety of styles, with some following the Diddley/Cobbs versions and others following the Wells/Guy versions. Gary Walker recorded a version that reached number 26 in March 1966 on the UK Singles Chart.

Notes

References

Bibliography

1955 songs
1960 singles
Junior Wells songs
Vee-Jay Records singles
Blues songs